Terasca, or Terrier-ASROC-Cajun, was an American three-stage sounding rocket developed and launched by the United States Navy. Derived from a combination of the Terrier, ASROC and Cajun rockets, three launches were attempted during 1959, but only one was successful.

Design and development
The Terrier-ASROC-Cajun ("Terasca") rocket was developed during early 1959 by the Naval Ordnance Test Station, located at China Lake, California, to fill a U.S. Navy requirement for a three-stage sounding rocket, intended to launch experimental payloads for conducting high-altitude research. The rocket utilised a combination of existing missiles in its construction; the first stage was a Terrier surface-to-air missile; an ASROC anti-submarine rocket made up the second stage, while a Cajun sounding rocket was utilised as a third stage.

Operational history
Three launch attempts of the Terasca missile were made from the launch facility at Vandenberg Air Force Base during 1959, utilising the Western Launch and Test Range. The first launch attempt took place on May 1; this launch was a failure. A third launch, attempted on August 12, however, was also a failure; following the third launch, the Terasca program came to a close.

Launch history

References
Notes

Bibliography

Sounding rockets of the United States
Equipment of the United States Navy